The 1999–2000 Mid-American Conference men's basketball season began with practices in October 1999, followed by the start of the 1999–2000 NCAA Division I men's basketball season in November. Conference play began in January 2000 and concluded in March 2000. Central Michigan won the regular season title with a conference record of 14–4 by one game over second-place Kent State. Ball State defeated Miami in the MAC tournament final and represented the MAC in the NCAA tournament. There they lost to UCLA.  Kent State and Bowling Green both played in the NIT.

Preseason awards
The preseason poll was announced by the league office on October 21, 1999.

Preseason men's basketball poll
(First place votes in parenthesis)

East Division
  (15) 230
  (17) 220
  173 
  (2) 150
 Ohio (4) 146
  103
  40

West Division
  (20) 189
 Ball State (11) 162
  (3) 123
  (3) 117
  (1) 116
  87

Tournament champs
Kent State (15), Akron (12), Bowling Green (3), Ohio (4), Marshall (2), Toledo (1), Northern Illinois (1)

Honors

Postseason

Mid–American Tournament

NCAA tournament

Postseason awards

Coach of the Year: Gary Waters, Kent State
Player of the Year: Anthony Stacey, Bowling Green
Freshman of the Year: Theron Smith, Ball State
Defensive Player of the Year: Rob Mestas, Miami

Honors

References